Amendment 49 was a proposed initiative on the Colorado ballot for 2008. It was defeated.

Goals
According to the Blue Book, the state-provided ballot guide, Amendment 49 "proposes amending the Colorado Constitution to: prohibit any public employee paycheck deduction, except for:
 deductions required by federal law;
 tax withholdings;
 court-ordered liens and garnishments;
 health benefit and other insurance deductions;
 deductions for savings, investment, and retirement plans; and
 deductions for charitable, religious, educational, and other tax-exempt organizations."

Results

Support and opposition
Vote Yes On Amendment 49
Protect Colorado's Future

References 

Amendment 49
Initiatives in the United States
Constitution of Colorado